Wilmer Santiago Acasiete Ariadela (born 22 November 1977) is a Peruvian retired professional footballer who played as a central defender.

He also holds a Spanish passport due to the many years he spent in the country, mainly with Almería, with whom he appeared in four La Liga seasons.

Acasiete represented Peru in three Copa América tournaments.

Club career
Born in Callao, Acasiete started playing professionally with Deportivo Wanka, moving in the following year to Universitario de Deportes. After another sole season he joined Cienciano del Cuzco, helping the former country's capital side to the 2003 South American Cup and the 2004 South American Supercup.

For 2004–05, Acasiete signed with UD Almería in the Spanish second division. He was an important defensive element in the Andalusians first-ever promotion to La Liga in 2007, being used intermittently in the subsequent seasons however: in his first top level campaign in Spain he appeared in only 20 games, but still managed to award his team six points with last-minute home strikes against Sevilla FC and Villarreal CF (both 1–0).

Following the end of 2011–12, spent again in the second level, 34-year-old Acasiete opted out of his contract with Almería and returned to his former club Cienciano.

International career
Acasiete gained more than 40 caps for the Peru national team, the first on 18 February 2004 at almost 27, and participated at the 2004 and 2007 Copa América.

On 7 December 2007, he was found guilty of having introduced women and alcohol into the national squad's hotel two days before Peru's away drubbing at the hands of Ecuador (5–1), and was thus suspended 18 months (1.5 years) from international competition (national sides only). On 3 July of the following year, after an investigation and a review of the facts, the suspension was changed to three months (from the date of appeal in April) with a US$10,000 fine.

Honours

Club
Cienciano
Copa Sudamericana: 2003
Recopa Sudamericana: 2004

Country
Copa América: Third-place 2011

References

External links

1977 births
Living people
Sportspeople from Callao
Peruvian footballers
Association football defenders
Peruvian Primera División players
Club Deportivo Wanka footballers
Club Universitario de Deportes footballers
Cienciano footballers
La Liga players
Segunda División players
UD Almería players
Peru international footballers
2004 Copa América players
2007 Copa América players
2011 Copa América players
Peruvian expatriate footballers
Expatriate footballers in Spain
Naturalised citizens of Spain
Spanish people of Peruvian descent
Peruvian expatriate sportspeople in Spain